"Thursday" is a song by English synth-pop duo Pet Shop Boys, featuring vocals from English singer and rapper Example. It was released on 4 November 2013 as the fourth single from the Pet Shop Boys' twelfth studio album, Electric (2013). The song reached number 61 on the UK Singles Chart and is the highest-charting single from the album. The accompanying music video was filmed in Shanghai, China.

The song was played over the end credits of an episode of Looking.

Release
"Thursday" was released on CD single and in two digital bundles on 4 November 2013. Both physical and digital formats include remixes by Tensnake and Eddie Amador, as well as two previously unreleased B-sides, "No More Ballads" and "Odd Man Out". A twelve-inch single was released on 9 December 2013.

Live performances
The song was performed on the Electric Tour with Example's section projected on a big screen behind the band.

Track listings

Charts

References

2013 singles
2013 songs
Example (musician) songs
Pet Shop Boys songs
Song recordings produced by Stuart Price
Songs written by Chris Lowe
Songs written by Example (musician)
Songs written by Neil Tennant